Hamëz Jashari (19 April 1950 – 7 March 1998) was a Kosovar Albanian combatant and the brother of Adem Jashari. He was also a commander of the Kosovo Liberation Army (KLA). He accompanied his brother Adem during the Kosovo War, in 1998.

On 30 December 1991, when the brothers were at home in Prekaz, the Serbian police surrounded them in an attempt to arrest them, they managed to escape unharmed. Later, Adem and Hamëz started attacks against the Yugoslav Police.

Finally, on 5 March 1998, Prekaz was attacked by Yugoslav police forces. Adem and Hamëz Jashari and approximately 58 members of their family were killed, after the refusal of Adem Jashari and his brothers to surrender. The sole survivor of the attack was Hamëz's then 11-year-old daughter, Besarta.

In 2010 he received the order Hero of Kosovo by the president of Kosovo, Jakup Krasniqi.

Notes

References

1950 births
1998 deaths
Albanian nationalists in Kosovo
Guerrillas killed in action
Kosovo Liberation Army soldiers
Military personnel from Skenderaj